Continuum is the ninth studio album by South Korean R&B duo Fly to the Sky. It marks their first release since 2009 due to the members ventured into individual solo activities.

Overview
The album title was derived from the eponymous Latin word. It was conceived by member Brian as a statement that the duo had never disbanded despite numerous rumors and to reiterate their desire to continue making music together.

Track listing
Bold tracks are noted as the promotional tracks of the album.

  signifies a producer that has multiple song credits for the album.
  signifies a composer who is also the arranger.

Release and reception
Continuum was released on May 20, 2014 at midnight (KST) and launched by members Brian and Hwanhee during the showcase at 8am. The album debuted at #4 on the Gaon Album Chart. Every track in the album charted on the Gaon Digital Chart, with the title track "You You You" (너를 너를 너를) totaling over a million downloads by the end of the year.

"You You You" achieved an "all kill", debuting at #1 on the Gaon Digital Chart and Billboard's Korea K-Pop Hot 100. The accompanying music video for "You You You" was uploaded on YouTube. The song won the R&B genre award at the 6th Melon Music Awards.

English-language K-pop blog Seoulbeats.com described the album as "perfect for those days when you just aren’t “feeling” life, and need an emotional release".

References

External links
Album Information on Mnet
Continuum – iTunes

Fly to the Sky albums
2014 albums
Korean-language albums